Jane Mulvagh is an Irish-born journalist and social historian, specialising in British history. She is best known for her history of Madresfield Court, the English country house upon which Evelyn Waugh based his novel Brideshead Revisited.

Early life and career
Mulvagh has Irish roots and was educated at an English convent before going up to Girton College, Cambridge, to read History. Her early interest in fashion history led to eight years at Vogue, as a fashion historian and features writer. Mulvagh completed the Vogue History of Twentieth Century Fashion (Viking Penguin) in 1988. She left Vogue the following year and subsequently wrote a regular column in the Financial Times entitled "Me and my Wardrobe" and a monthly think-piece on style for that title.

Later career
From February 1990 Mulvagh was a presenter and reporter for British Satellite Broadcasting, known as BSB, during its inaugural year.  Working on the evening news and magazine show First Edition, Mulvagh produced three 7-minute pieces per week. She has made TV appearances on the BBC, Granada, RTE Dublin and BBC Radio 4.

Mulvagh has written on the history of design, art and social history for many British and American broadsheets, including The Daily Telegraph, The Times, The Art Newspaper, The Evening Standard, The European,  The Independent, The Daily Mail, and magazines such as Very Magazine, Town & Country Magazine, Harper's Bazaar (Harpers & Queen), The European, The Spectator and Apollo. She contributed over 40 Obituaries for The Independent.

Teaching and lecturing
From 1997 to 2002 Mulvagh taught an MA course in Fashion Journalism and Criticism at Central St Martins School of Art, now part of UAL. Her pupils included Financial Times fashion editor and stylist, Damian Foxe, Editor-in-Chief of Condé Nast online Abigail Chisman, and contemporary art gallerist Libby Sellers. 
Mulvagh delivered the thirteenth Annual Soane Lecture, on 13 November 2008, at Sir John Soane's Museum in London  and The Royal Oak Foundation Annual Lecture Tour in the United States in 2009. She has lectured at Oxford University (Harris Manchester College), Cheltenham Literature Festival and the Oxford Literary Festival.

Published works
Madresfield: The Real Brideshead, Transworld, (2008) ,
Vivienne Westwood, An Unfashionable Life, HarperCollins, (1998)  
Newport Houses, Rizzoli USA (1989) ASIN B01A1M6KUA - an architectural history of Newport, Rhode Island USA 
Costume Jewellery in Vogue, Thames and Hudson (1988) 
The Vogue History of Twentieth Century Fashion, Viking Penguin, London (1988)

References

External links
Official website
Portrait of Jane Mulvagh by Lucinda Douglas-Menzies
Harper Collins Publishers, Australia
Random House Publisher, Australia

Living people
Alumni of Girton College, Cambridge
British women historians
British Roman Catholics
English journalists
Alumni of Central Saint Martins
English fashion journalists
Year of birth missing (living people)